The 1989 UAAP men's basketball tournament was the 52nd year of the men's tournament of the University Athletic Association of the Philippines (UAAP)'s basketball championship. De La Salle University won their first UAAP crown at the expense of FEU Tamaraws.

Elimination round
Tournament format:
Double round robin; the two teams with the best records advance Finals:
The #1 seed will only need to win once to clinch the championship.
The #2 seed has to win twice to clinch the championship.
Notes: Adamson Falcons and UST Glowing Goldies' 2nd round outing against NU Bulldogs could be assumed as a victory.

First round results

De La Salle University won their first nine games before losing to arch rival Ateneo Blue Eagles, 61-67 on September 17, playing without national team players Jun Limpot and Johnedel Cardel.

FEU Tamaraws and De La Salle Green Archers were tied at 11 wins and two losses going into the final playing date. The Tamaraws edged the Green Archers, 78-77, on free throws by Andy De Guzman as FEU is one win away from winning the crown.

Finals

The Tamaraws narrowly missed winning Game one of the finals as they were dragged into overtime before yielding. Andy de Guzman of FEU knotted the count at 77-all with 19 seconds left in regulation period.

The Archers trailed by six points, 47-53, when a 13-1 run gave La Salle a 60-54 advantage. The Tamaraws came within 67-71, on two free throws by rookie playmaker Johnny Abarrientos, but Green Archer Eddie Viaplana hit a three-pointer to iced the game, 74-67 for La Salle, with 35 seconds remaining.

See also
NCAA Season 65 basketball tournaments

References

52
1989 in Philippine basketball